Operation Surgeon was a British post-Second World War programme to exploit German aeronautics and deny German technical skills to the Soviet Union.

A list of 1,500 German scientists and technicians was created, with the goal of forcibly removing them from Germany ("whether they like it or not") to lessen the risk of their falling into enemy hands. It was feared that if they remained in Germany, they could enable the Soviet Union to "achieve a long range bomber force superior to any other in the world".

At the operation's inception, many of the scientists had already offered their services to British Commonwealth countries, Sweden, Switzerland, Brazil and South America, and regarded working for the Soviet Union as a last resort, should they be prevented from working in Germany and unable to find employment elsewhere in the west.

Of the scientists relocated from 1946-1947, 100 chose to work for the UK.

British records of the operation were made public in 2006.

See also
 T-Force
 Similar (but separate) attempts to remove German technical information and personnel after the war were:
 Operation Paperclip  - US removal of German rocketry experts and materials.
 TICOM (cryptography)
 Operation Alsos (nuclear weapons)
 Operation Osoaviakhim

Notes and references
Notes

Bibliography

Further reading
 Matthew Uttley "Operation 'Surgeon' and Britain's post-war exploitation of Nazi German aeronautics", Intelligence and National Security, Volume 17, Number 2, June 2002, pp. 1-26(26) Publisher: Routledge, part of the Taylor & Francis Group
 John Gimbel, Science Technology and Reparations: Exploitation and Plunder in Postwar Germany Stanford University Press, 1990 
 Matthias Judt;  Burghard Ciesla, Technology Transfer Out of Germany After 1945 Harwood Academic Publishers, 1996. 
 John Gimbel U.S. Policy and German Scientists: The Early Cold War, Political Science Quarterly, Vol. 101, No. 3 (1986), pp. 433–451

External links
 Employment of German scientists and technicians: denial policy UK National archives releases March 2006.
 Dark side of the Moon BBC article.

 
Surgeon
Surgeon
Soviet Union–United Kingdom relations